The Commandement des Opérations Spéciales or COS is a joint staff charged with overseeing the various special forces of the French Army, Navy and Air and Space Force, bringing them all under a single operational authority. The command is placed under the orders of the Chief of Defence Staff and under the direct authority of the President of the French Republic.

Similar in purpose to the USSOCOM or UKSF, the COS was created on June 24, 1992. The need for such a federation became apparent after France's participation in the First Gulf War.

Organisation

Army 
 Army Special Forces Command
 1st Marine Infantry Parachute Regiment (1er RPIMa)
Command and Logistics Company
1 SAS Company - HAHO/HALO paratroopers and divers
2 SAS Company - Extreme environments
3 SAS Company - Vehicle borne operations
4 SAS Company - Urban warfare
Training company 
 13th Parachute Dragoon Regiment (13e RDP)
ECP Squadron - Command and logistics
1e Squadron - Training and evaluation unit nicknamed "Intelligence Academy"
2e Squadron - Combat divers
3e Squadron - Extreme environments 
4e Squadron - Vehicle borne operations
5e Squadron - HAHO/HALO paratroopers
6e Squadron - Signals 
7e Squadron - Intelligence 
 4th Special Forces Helicopter Regiment (4e RHFS)
Squadron 1 - equipped with 10 Cougar and 2 Puma helicopters
Squadron 2 - equipped with 12 Gazelle helicopters
Squadron 3 - equipped with 10 Caracal helicopters
Squadron 4 - equipped with 5 Puma helicopters
Squadron 5 - equipped with 2 Puma helicopters
Squadron 6 - equipped with 6 Tigre helicopters
 Special Operations Support Group
 Special Forces Academy

Navy 
Force des Fusiliers Marins et Commandos (FORFUSCO)
 Commandos Marine
 Commando Hubert - Combat divers, counter-terrorism, and hostage rescue
 Commando Jaubert - Direct action, counter-terrorism, and hostage rescue
 Commando Trépel - Direct action, counter-terrorism, and hostage rescue
 Commando de Penfentenyo - Reconnaissance
 Commando de Montfort - Reconnaissance
 Commando Kieffer - Electronic warfare
 Commando Ponchardier - Operational Support

Air and Space Force 
Air and Space Force Special Forces Brigade (BFSA)
 Air Parachute Commando n° 10 (CPA 10) - Direct Action & Counter-terrorism
 Air Parachute Commando n° 30 (CPA 30) - Combat Search and Rescue  
 
 Special Operations Division (DOS)
 Special Operations Division, Transport section (3/61 Poitou)
 Special Operations Division, Helicopter section (1/67 Pyrénées) - Integrated into the 4th RHFS.

See also 
 List of special forces units
 List of French paratrooper units
 United States Special Operations Command (USSOCOM or SOCOM) - US equivalent command
 United Kingdom Special Forces - British equivalent command

References

External links 
 Specwarnet.com
 Le.cos.free.fr 
 Netmarine.net 
 Dogs of the French Special Forces, published by Le Monde

Special forces of France
1992 establishments in France
Military units and formations established in 1992